Eloy Cavazos (born 25 August 1949 in Ciudad Guadalupe, Nuevo León, México) was a Mexican matador.

History

He debuted in Plaza México on 12 July 1966, with Gonzalo Iturbe and Leonardo Manzanos.

He took his alternativa in Plaza Monterrey, Nuevo León, México, on 28 August 1966.  His Padrino was Antonio Velázquez. His Testigo was Manolo Martinez.  His first bull was named "Cariñoso", from the ranch of San Miguel Mimiahuapam.

He took his confirmación in Plaza México, on 14 January 1968.  His Padrino was Alfredo Leal.  His Testigo was Jaime Rangel.  Bulls were from the ranch of Jesús Cabrera.

He took his confirmación in Madrid, Spain, on 22 May 1971.  His Padrino was Miguel Mateo "Miguelín".  His Testigo was Gabriel de la Casa.  Bulls were from the ranch of José Luis Osborne.

Personal

He resides in Guadalupe, Nuevo León, a suburb of Monterrey, Nuevo Leon México. 

Eloy Cavazos and Jaime Bravo were in a tragic 1970 automobile accident, near Zacatecas, México.  Eloy survived.  Jaime died, shortly thereafter.  Their driver died in the accident.  The accident occurred after a bullfight, in Zacatecas, where Jaime Bravo had just won that year's "Golden Sword" award.  The sword disappeared in the accident.  Eloy Cavazos's manager, Rafael Baez, had also been the late Matador Jaime Bravo's manager.

References

External links
 "Haunted By The Horns", (2006) An ESPN online article about Alejandro Amaya and Eloy Cavazos, it seeks why a matador has chosen their profession.
 "Story Of A Matador" (1962).  A 30-minute David Wolper episode, provides an excellent insight into what it's like to be a matador.
 Eloy Cavazos  in the Spanish Language Wikipedia
 Eloy Cavazos at ToroPedia.com
 Portal Taurino

Sources
 ESPN "Haunted By The Horns"
 Official Matador Jaime Bravo Website
 Portal Taurino.

1949 births
Mexican bullfighters
Sportspeople from Nuevo León
People from Guadalupe, Nuevo León
Living people